James Cargas is an American energy attorney, and was the Democratic nominee in the 2012, 2014 and 2016 United States House of Representatives election in Texas' 7th Congressional District. He is a life-long Democrat. He had the highest vote percentage (44% in 2016, opposing John Culberson) of any Democrat in Texas Congressional District 7 between 1964 and 2018. Cargas ran for the Democratic nomination in District 7 again in 2018 but lost the primary to Lizzie Fletcher. In 2018, Democrat Lizzie Fletcher defeated Culberson by a 52.3% to 47.7% margin.

Early life and career 
In 1989 after graduating from the University of Michigan with a double major in English and Communications, James Cargas became the Deputy Press Secretary to David Bonior, then Member of the U.S. House of Representatives from Michigan's 12th Congressional District.

In 1992, he graduated from the American University Washington College of Law where he served as President of the Environmental Law Society and Articles' Editor of The American University Journal of International Law and Policy. Upon graduation, he worked first in a large law firm and later as environmental counsel to a major interstate pipeline company. He is admitted to practice law in Texas, Washington DC, Michigan and West Virginia.

He left the private sector and joined the Clinton White House and the President’s Council on Sustainable Development.

After leaving the White House to work on the Al Gore Presidential primary campaign in Washington DC, Iowa and Texas, Cargas rejoined the administration as a Special Assistant in the U.S. Department of Energy in the Office of Fossil Energy under Secretary of Energy Bill Richardson.  He also served as the Energy Department's liaison to the President's Southwest Border Task Force. He was awarded the Exceptional Service Award of the Department of Energy

He permanently moved to Houston and became Deputy Director of the non-profit organization North American Energy Standards Board. After three years, he returned to private practice where he represented several startup companies in the energy marketing, directional drilling, and other industries.

In 2008, Houston Mayor Bill White hired Cargas as the Senior Assistant City Attorney for Energy of the City of Houston responsible for advising the Mayor on all aspects of energy procurement and energy transactional matters. Today, he works for  Mayor Sylvester Turner in the same function and also advises the City on contract, environmental, renewable energy, real estate and regulatory matters.

Cargas is a founding member of the Oil Patch Democrats, a Texas-based political organization promoting "realistic energy policy" and Democratic candidates.

Cargas is married to Dr. Dorina Papageorgiou, a neuroscientist at Baylor College of Medicine in Houston, Texas.

2012 Congressional Election
Cargas ran in the 2012 election for the United States House of Representatives, in Texas' 7th Congressional District. He won the Democratic nomination for Texas' 7th Congressional District after a contested primary. Cargas received 36.43% of the vote against incumbent John Culberson (R) in the general election on November 6, 2012. He has been endorsed by the Houston Chronicle, The National Herald, NEO Magazine, and Washington Monthly.

The Texas House of Representatives district maps were the subject of courtroom battles in the lead up to the 2012 election. Although the federal court rejected maps drawn by the State Legislature due to racial discrimination, the final court-appointed maps included several of the original boundaries at the request of the Texas attorney general. The 7th District lost Memorial Park, Montrose, Spring Branch and Rice University to the 2nd District.

Cargas campaigned on a platform consisting of the following central issues:
 Increasing federal funding for science and biotechnology. His positions are included in Research!America.
 Comprehensive national energy policy
 Protecting social safety nets
 Protecting women’s rights
 Enacting comprehensive immigration reform
 Supporting public transportation

2014 Congressional Election
Cargas won the Democratic nomination in the 2014 Democratic Primary for Texas' 7th Congressional District with 62.2% of the vote following an endorsement by the Houston Chronicle. In the general election on November 4, 2014 Cargas received 34.55% of the vote against incumbent John Culberson (R).

2016 Congressional Election
Cargas ran again in Texas' 7th Congressional District in 2016. Cargas garnered the highest vote percentage (44%) of any Democrat in Texas 7 since 1964, though he did so while losing a district that Democratic presidential nominee Hillary Clinton simultaneously carried in her unsuccessful bid for the presidency.

2018 Congressional Election
Cargas ran again in Texas' 7th Congressional District in 2018, but was defeated in the Democratic Primary.

References

External links

 Blog

1966 births
Living people
Lawyers from Detroit
Texas Democrats
University of Michigan College of Literature, Science, and the Arts alumni
Lawyers from Houston
People associated with renewable energy
Politicians from Houston